In geometry, an icosagon or 20-gon is a twenty-sided polygon. The sum of any icosagon's interior angles is 3240 degrees.

Regular icosagon

The regular icosagon has Schläfli symbol , and can also be constructed as a truncated decagon, or a twice-truncated pentagon, .

One interior angle in a regular icosagon is 162°, meaning that one exterior angle would be 18°.

The area of a regular icosagon with edge length  is

In terms of the radius  of its circumcircle, the area is

since the area of the circle is  the regular icosagon fills approximately 98.36% of its circumcircle.

Uses
The Big Wheel on the popular US game show The Price Is Right has an icosagonal cross-section.

The Globe, the outdoor theater used by William Shakespeare's acting company, was discovered to have been built on an icosagonal foundation when a partial excavation was done in 1989.

As a golygonal path, the swastika is considered to be an irregular icosagon.

A regular square, pentagon, and icosagon can completely fill a plane vertex.

Construction
As , regular icosagon is constructible using a compass and straightedge, or by an edge-bisection of a regular decagon, or a twice-bisected regular pentagon:

The golden ratio in an icosagon 

Symmetry

The regular icosagon has  symmetry, order 40.

These 10 symmetries can be seen in 16 distinct symmetries on the icosagon, a larger number because the lines of reflections can either pass through vertices or edges. John Conway labels these by a letter and group order. The dihedral symmetries are divided depending on whether they pass through vertices ( for diagonal) or edges ( for perpendiculars), and  when reflection lines path through both edges and vertices.

Each subgroup symmetry allows one or more degrees of freedom for irregular forms. Only the  subgroup has no degrees of freedom but can seen as directed edges.

These two forms are duals of each other and have half the symmetry order of the regular icosagon.

Dissection

Coxeter states that every zonogon (a -gon whose opposite sides are parallel and of equal length) can be dissected into  parallelograms.
In particular this is true for regular polygons with evenly many sides, in which case the parallelograms are all rhombi.  For the icosagon, and it can be divided into 45: 5 squares and 4 sets of 10 rhombs. This decomposition is based on a Petrie polygon projection of a 10-cube, with 45 of 11520 faces. The list  enumerates the number of solutions as 18,410,581,880, including up to 20-fold rotations and chiral forms in reflection.

Related polygons
An icosagram is a 20-sided star polygon, represented by symbol .

Deeper truncations of the regular decagon and decagram can produce isogonal (vertex-transitive) intermediate icosagram forms with equally spaced vertices and two edge lengths.

A regular icosagram, can be seen as a quasitruncated decagon, . Similarly a decagram,  has a quasitruncation , and finally a simple truncation of a decagram gives .

Petrie polygons
The regular icosagon is the Petrie polygon for a number of higher-dimensional polytopes, shown in orthogonal projections in Coxeter planes:

It is also the Petrie polygon for the icosahedral 120-cell, small stellated 120-cell, great icosahedral 120-cell, and great grand 120-cell.

References

External links
Naming Polygons and Polyhedra
icosagon

Constructible polygons
Polygons by the number of sides